Henry Sandford King (1862 - 1930) was an Australian geographer who served as the Surveyor General of Western Australia from 1918 to 1923.

Biography 

He was born in Creswick, Victoria, Australia in May 1862.

He got married to Dorothea Lefroy (daughter of Gerald de Courcy and Elizabeth Brockman) in 1886. They had six children.

He died in 1930 in Papua New Guinea. The cause of his death was determined to be pneumonia.

Education 

He completed his schooling at Geelong Grammar School.

He later attended the Wesley College, Melbourne.

Career  

He obtained his Licensed Surveyor's Certificate in 1883.

He served as the Surveyor General of Western Australia from 1918 to 1923.

The Lake King, Western Australia is named after him.

See also 

 List of pastoral leases in Western Australia
 Surveyor General of Western Australia
 Lake King, Western Australia

References

External links 
 Biography 1
 Biography 2
 Surveyor Generals of Western Australia

Australian geographers
Australian surveyors
1862 births
1930 deaths
Surveyors General of Western Australia